Resurrection (Resurrección) is an Argentinian 2016 horror movie written and directed by Gonzalo Calzada. The movie was simultaneously premiered on Jan 7, 2016 in Argentina and Peru. Upon its release, the film reached historical box office records for the genre in Argentina.

Plot 
Set in the context of the Yellow fever epidemic that struck the city of Buenos Aires in 1871, Resurrección is the story of a young priest who, impelled by a mystical vision, goes to the capital city to assist the victims and sick people affected by the terrible epidemic. A series of unexpected events corners him in that place and makes him doubt the meaning of his initial mission, his beliefs and finally also his faith.

Cast 
Patricio Contreras as Quispe/Ernesto
Martín Slipak as Father Aparicio
Vando Villamil as Healer
Adrián Navarro as Edgardo
Lola Ahumada as Remedios
Ana Fontán as Lucía
Diego Alonso as Eugenio

External links

References 

2016 films
Argentine horror films
Films about viral outbreaks